The Population Research Institute (PRI) is a 501(c)3 non-profit organization based in Front Royal, Virginia, US. The organization  opposes abortion. They believe that overpopulation is a myth, and oppose  hormonal birth control in females and vasectomies in males.
In addition, the organization issues opinion pieces questioning the veracity of human driven climate change and the natural origin of COVID-19.

Background
The Population Research Institute was founded in 1989 by Paul Marx (1920–2010), a family sociologist, Catholic priest and Benedictine monk who had established the anti-abortion group Human Life International as well. It became an independent institute in 1996. The same year, the think tank got headed by Steven W. Mosher, a social researcher and author who had witnessed forced abortions in China during the implementation of the one-child policy in 1980.

Activities
PRI opposes government attempts to control the population. According to the Los Angeles Times, PRI's Mosher successfully helped lobby the George W. Bush administration to withhold US$34 to $40 million per year for seven years from the United Nations Population Fund (UNFPA), the largest international donor to family planning programs. The research institute opined that UNPFA was using American money to fund Chinese compulsory sterilization and abortions, a claim denied by the population fund, noting that it does not work in areas where the one-child policy in still in force.  Mosher also advocated against the Chinese two-child policy, claiming that it was "being pushed to the masses through the communist party mechanism".

Fundraising
PRI obtains the vast majority of its funding from charitable contributions, gifts, and grants, with a total revenue of 1.46 million dollars in financial year 2018. Of this, 75.6% was spent on program expenses, 4.9% on administration, and 19.3% on fundraising.

The institute has received funding from The Lynde and Harry Bradley Foundation, Inc., claimed to be in support of conferences on human rights in China.

Criticism
PRI's stance on overpopulation and the arguments for "Overpopulation is a Myth" have been described as deceptive.

Charity Navigator classifies charities with respect to "Accountability & Transparency" and "Financial Performance". In 2020 it awarded two out of four stars to PRI for "Accountability & Transparency", and one for "Financial", which combined for an overall score of 70.46, rated as two stars.

References

External links
 

501(c)(3) organizations
1989 establishments in Virginia
Anti-abortion organizations in the United States
Human overpopulation think tanks
Non-profit organizations based in Front Royal, Virginia
Population research organizations
Research institutes established in 1989
Research institutes in Virginia
Think tanks established in 1989
Think tanks based in the United States